Auriglobus remotus is a species of pufferfish in the family Tetraodontidae. It is a tropical freshwater species known only from Indonesia that reaches 6.2 cm (2.4 inches) SL. Like the other four members of Auriglobus, it was previously classified in the genus Chonerhinos.

References 

Tetraodontidae
Fish described in 1982